The Rivière Chézine (English: Chézine River) is a tributary of the Sainte-Anne River flowing in the unorganized territory of Lac-Croche and the municipality of Saint-Gabriel-de-Valcartier, in the La Jacques-Cartier Regional County Municipality, in the administrative region of Capitale-Nationale, in Quebec, in Canada.

The lower part of the Chézine river is mainly served by the forest road R0354 (north–south direction) for the needs of forestry and recreational tourism activities. The upper part is served by the forest road R0300 (north–south direction) which passes on the east side of Chézine Lake. While the intermediate part has no access road because of the high cliffs on each side of the river.

The main economic activities in the sector are forestry and recreational tourism activities.

The surface of the Chézine River (except the rapids areas) is generally frozen from the beginning of December to the end of March, but the safe circulation on the ice is generally made from the end of December to the beginning of March. The water level of the river varies with the seasons and the precipitation; the spring flood occurs in March or April.

Geography 
The Chézine River rises at the mouth of Chézine Lake (altitude ) in the unorganized territory of Lac-Croche. This lake between the mountains is fed by only two mountain streams.

  towards the south by crossing two small lakes, until the discharge (coming from the northwest) of an unidentified lake;
  towards the south by forking towards the south-east to the outlet (coming from the west) of an unidentified lake;
  towards the south-east in a deep valley, collecting a stream (coming from the north) to the outlet (coming from the south) of Lac Lelièvre;
  towards the south-east in a well-steep valley until the confluence of the Chézine North River (coming from the north);
  to the south in a well-boxed valley, gradually bending towards the south-east until its mouth.

The Chézine river flows on the west bank of the Sainte-Anne river.

From this confluence, the current descends on  generally south and southwest following the course of the Sainte-Anne river, to the northwest bank of the Saint Lawrence river.

The river flows entirely in the zec Batiscan-Neilson.

Toponymy 
The Chézine is a river of the Loire-Atlantique, in France, which flows into the Loire in Nantes.

The toponym "Chézine river" was formalized on December 5, 1968, at the Place Names Bank of the Commission de toponymie du Québec.

See also 

 Laurentides Wildlife Reserve
 Forêt ancienne de la Rivière-Chézine (English: Rivière-Chézine old forest)
 Zec Batiscan-Neilson
 La Jacques-Cartier Regional County Municipality
 Lac-Croche, an unorganized territory
 Saint-Gabriel-de-Valcartier, a municipality
 Sainte-Anne River (Mauricie)
 Chézine North River
 Chézine Lake
 List of rivers of Quebec

References

Bibliography

External links 
 

Rivers of Capitale-Nationale
La Jacques-Cartier Regional County Municipality